The 1993–94 Vancouver Canucks season was the Canucks' 24th NHL season. Vancouver finished the season second in their division and qualified for the playoffs as the number seven seed. In the playoffs, the Canucks pulled several upsets and reached the Stanley Cup Finals for the second time in franchise history. In the finals they fell behind the New York Rangers three games to one before making a comeback to force a Game 7. Vancouver fell short in its bid to capture the franchise's first Stanley Cup losing Game 7 by a final of 3–2.

During the regular season, Pavel Bure tied his own club record for goals in a season, originally set in the 1992–93 season. Bure's 60 goals led the NHL and as a result he was named a First Team NHL All-Star. Kirk McLean won a team leading 23 games during the regular season, only 8 more than the 15 he recorded in the post-season games. Jeff Brown officially led the team in assists, but did not join the team till after the trade deadline when he was acquired from St. Louis.

In the playoffs, both Bure and captain Trevor Linden were very productive. Bure led all forwards in playoff scoring finishing second overall to Brian Leetch. However, Bure led the league in playoff goals with Linden tied for second. McLean led the playoffs in minutes played, shots against and saves while he and the Rangers Mike Richter tied for the lead in playoff shutouts. McLean finished fourth in goals against average and save percentage.

Regular season

Schedule and results

Playoffs

Western Conference Quarter-finals: vs. (2) Calgary Flames
Vancouver wins series 4–3

Western Conference Semi-finals: vs. (4) Dallas Stars
Vancouver wins series 4–1

Western Conference Final: vs. (3) Toronto Maple Leafs
Vancouver wins series 4–1

Stanley Cup Final: vs. (E1) New York Rangers
New York wins series 4–3

Player statistics

Scoring leaders

Note: GP = Games played; G = Goals; A = Assists; Pts = Points; +/- = Plus/minus; PIM = Penalty minutes

Goaltending
Note: GP = Games played; TOI = Time on ice (minutes); W = Wins; L = Losses; OT = Overtime losses; GA = Goals against; SO = Shutouts; Sv% = Save percentage; GAA = Goals against average

Playoffs

Scoring leaders

Note: GP = Games played; G = Goals; A = Assists; Pts = Points; +/- = Plus/minus; PIM = Penalty minutes

Goaltending

Note: GP = Games played; TOI = Time on ice (minutes); W = Wins; L = Losses; GA = Goals against; SO = Shutouts; Sv% = Save percentage; GAA = Goals against average

Awards and records
 Clarence S. Campbell Bowl
 Pavel Bure, NHL Leader, Goals (60)
 Pavel Bure, Club Record, Goals in a Season (60)
 Pavel Bure, Molson Cup (Most game star selections for Vancouver Canucks)
 Pavel Bure, Cyclone Taylor Award (MVP of the Canucks)

Transactions

Trades

Free Agents Acquired

Free Agents Lost

Received from Waivers

Placed on Waivers

Expansion draft
Vancouver's losses at the 1993 NHL Expansion Draft in Quebec City, Quebec.

Draft picks
Vancouver's picks at the 1993 NHL Entry Draft in Quebec City, Quebec.

Farm teams

Hamilton Canucks
AHL affiliate based in Hamilton, Ontario and whose home arena was Copps Coliseum. This was the team's second and final season as an affiliate of the Canucks. In the 1993–94 AHL season, Hamilton finished in 2nd place in the South Division, but was eliminated in the first round of the AHL playoffs by the Cornwall Aces in four straight games. After the season, the franchise was relocated as the Syracuse Crunch, which kept its affiliation with Vancouver.

Columbus Chill
ECHL affiliate based in Columbus, Ohio, and whose home arena was the Ohio Expo Center Coliseum.

References

External links

1993-94
1993-1994
Vancouver
Vancouver
V